Jemina is the name of:
 Jemina Pearl (born 1987), American singer, formerly the frontwoman of Be Your Own Pet
Jemina Staalo, a  Finnish writer